Anna Finocchiaro Fidelbo (born 31 March 1955) is an Italian politician. She was the Democratic Party's leader in the Senate from 2007 to 2013. She served as Minister for Equal Opportunities in the cabinet of Romano Prodi from 1996 to 1998.

Biography
Born in Modica, Finocchiaro graduated in law in 1978, and she worked for the Banca d'Italia's branch in Savona before becoming a magistrate in Leonforte in 1982. She served as a magistrate until 1985, when she was appointed as a deputy public prosecutor at the court of Catania. She was first elected to the Chamber of Deputies as a member of the Italian Communist Party in 1987; she was elected to Catania's council in 1988. Finocchiaro was later a member of both the Democratic Party of the Left and the Democrats of the Left, and she was a founding member of the Democratic Party (PD) in 2007.

Finocchiaro served as Minister for Equal Opportunities in the first cabinet of Romano Prodi from 1996 to 1998. She stood for the Senate for the first time in the 2006 Italian general election; she was named as the group chair of the Olive Tree coalition following her election. Finocchiaro was named the leader of the PD in the Senate following the party's creation in 2007 and was reconfirmed as leader following the 2008 Italian general election. In 2008 she also stood unsuccessfully to be President of Sicily.

After being under investigation by the Italian courts for abuse of office aggravated fraud, her husband was completely acquitted on all counts in 2018.

References

1955 births
Living people
People from Modica
Italian Communist Party politicians
Democratic Party of the Left politicians
Democrats of the Left politicians
Democratic Party (Italy) politicians
Government ministers of Italy
Deputies of Legislature X of Italy
Deputies of Legislature XI of Italy
Deputies of Legislature XII of Italy
Deputies of Legislature XIII of Italy
Deputies of Legislature XIV of Italy
Senators of Legislature XV of Italy
Senators of Legislature XVI of Italy
Senators of Legislature XVII of Italy
Politicians from the Province of Ragusa
21st-century Italian women politicians
Women government ministers of Italy
20th-century Italian women politicians
Women members of the Chamber of Deputies (Italy)
Women members of the Senate of the Republic (Italy)